Whakatāne District Council or Whakatane District Council is the territorial authority for the Whakatāne District of New Zealand.

The council is led by the mayor of Whakatāne, who is currently . There are also 10 ward councillors.

Composition

2022–2025 elected members 
Victor Luca, Mayor
Lesley Immink, Deputy Mayor
 Julie Jukes, Councillor for Whakatāne-Ōhope General ward
 Nándor Tánczos, Councillor for Whakatāne-Ōhope General ward
 Andrew Iles, Councillor for Te Urewera General ward
 Gavin Dennis, Councillor for Rangitāiki General ward
 Wilson James, Councillor for Rangitāiki General ward
 John Pullar, Councillor for Whakatāne-Ōhope General ward
 Tu O'Brien, Councillor for Rangitāiki General ward
 Toni Boynton, Councillor for Kapu te rangi Māori Ward
 Ngapera Rangiaho, Councillor for Toi ki Uta Māori Ward

2019–2022 elected members 

 Judy Turner, Mayor
 Andrew Iles, Deputy Mayor
 Julie Jukes, Councillor for Whakatāne-Ōhope ward
 Alison Silcock, Councillor for Galatea-Murupara ward
 Nándor Tánczos, Councillor for Whakatāne-Ōhope ward
 Gerard van Beek, Councillor for Rangitāiki ward
 Victor Luca, Councillor for Whakatāne-Ōhope ward
 Gavin Dennis, Councillor for Rangitāiki Ward
 Wilson James, Councillor for Rangitāiki ward
 Lesley Immink, Councillor for Whakatāne-Ōhope ward
 John Pullar, Councillor for Whakatāne-Ōhope ward

References

External links

 Official website

Whakatane District
Politics of the Bay of Plenty Region
Territorial authorities of New Zealand